Taleggio (Talegg in Lombard language) is a semisoft, washed-rind, smear-ripened Italian cheese that is named after Val Taleggio. The cheese has a thin crust and a strong aroma, but its flavour is comparatively mild with an unusual fruity tang.

History
Taleggio and similar cheeses have been around since Roman times, with Cicero, Cato the Elder, and Pliny the Elder all mentioning it in their writings.  The cheese was solely produced in the Val Taleggio until the late 1800s, when some production moved to the Lombardy plain to the south.

Production

The production takes place every autumn and winter.  First, acidified milk is mixed with rennet taken from milk calves. The cheese is set on wood shelves in chambers, sometimes in caves as per tradition, and matures within six to ten weeks. It is washed once a week with a seawater sponge to prevent mould growth and to form an orange or rose crust.

Today, the cheese is made from both pasteurised milk and raw milk in factories.  The factory-made cheeses are brighter and moderate in flavour.

Presentation

The cheese can be eaten grated with salads such as radicchio or rucola (rocket, arugula) and with spices and tomato on bruschetta.  It melts well, and can be used in risotto or on polenta.

Nutritional information

See also
 List of cheeses

References

External links

 The Consortium Protection Taleggio website

Cow's-milk cheeses
Italian products with protected designation of origin
Smear-ripened cheeses
Cheeses with designation of origin protected in the European Union
Lombard cheeses